József Kardos (29 March 1960 – 28 July 2022) was a Hungarian footballer who played as a defender for Újpesti Dózsa and the Hungary national team.

Career
Kardos was born in Nagybátony. He made his debut for the Hungary national team in 1980, and received 33 caps and scored 3 goals between then and 1987. He was a participant at the 1986 FIFA World Cup in Mexico, where Hungary failed to progress from the group stage. In 1983 he received the Hungarian Football Player of the Year award.

Personal life
Kardos died 28 July 2022, at the age of 62.

References

External links

1960 births
2022 deaths
Sportspeople from Nógrád County
Hungarian footballers
Association football defenders
Hungary international footballers
1986 FIFA World Cup players
Nemzeti Bajnokság I players
Super League Greece players
Újpest FC players
Salgótarjáni BTC footballers
Vasas SC players
Vác FC players
Apollon Pontou FC players
Hungarian expatriate footballers
Hungarian expatriate sportspeople in Greece
Expatriate footballers in Greece